Saran division is an administrative geographical unit of Bihar state of India. Chhapra is the administrative headquarters of the division.  Currently (2005), the division consists of Saran District, also called Chhapra District, Siwan District, Gopalganj District.

Hathwa Raj was a zamindari in the Saran Division of Bihar belonging to Bhumihars which encompassed 1,365 villages, was inhabited by more than 391,000 people, and produced an annual rental of almost a million rupees.

See also

Divisions of Bihar
Districts of Bihar

References

 
Divisions of Bihar